Asbjørn Engelhardt Midtgaard (born 20 September 1997) is a Danish professional basketball player for the Crailsheim Merlins of the German Basketball Bundesliga. He played college basketball for the Wichita State Shockers and the Grand Canyon Antelopes.

Early life and career
Midtgaard grew up playing handball and football, as well as weightlifting and judo. He started playing basketball at age 14, and joined the Hørsholm 79ers of the Basketligaen, the top professional league in Denmark, three years later. In the 2016–17 season, he averaged 8.6 points and 6.3 rebounds per game and was named Basketligaen Young Player of the Year.

College career
Midtgaard received limited playing time during his three seasons at Wichita State. He averaged 2.7 points and 2.6 rebounds per game in his time with the program. For his senior season, he transferred to Grand Canyon. On 28 November 2020, Midtgaard scored a career-high 20 points in a 94–63 win against Benedictine Mesa. As a senior, Midtgaard averaged 14.2 points, 9.7 rebounds and 1.3 blocks per game, and shot an NCAA Division I-best 70.7 percent from the field. He received First Team All-Western Athletic Conference, Newcomer of the Year and All-Defensive Team honors.

Professional career
After going undrafted in the 2021 NBA draft, Midtgaard signed with the Orlando Magic for the 2021 NBA Summer League. He became the first Grand Canyon player since the program entered the NCAA Division I to be invited to the Summer League.

On 16 August 2021, Midtgaard signed his first professional contract with ZZ Leiden of the BNXT League. He was nominated for the BNXT League Most Valuable Player award and ended third in voting. Midtgaard earned a spot in the All-BNXT League Dream Team.

On June 24, 2022, he put pen to paper on a deal with the Crailsheim Merlins of the German Basketball Bundesliga.

National team career
Midtgaard represented Denmark at the 2015 FIBA Europe Under-18 Championship Division B in Austria, and averaged 7.3 points and 8.4 rebounds per game.

Career statistics

College

|-
| style="text-align:left;"| 2017–18
| style="text-align:left;"| Wichita State
| 8 || 0 || 6.1 || .500 || – || .500 || 2.1 || .0 || .1 || .3 || 1.4
|-
| style="text-align:left;"| 2018–19
| style="text-align:left;"| Wichita State
| 34 || 3 || 11.3 || .632 || – || .595 || 3.1 || .2 || .1 || .8 || 3.9
|-
| style="text-align:left;"| 2019–20
| style="text-align:left;"| Wichita State
| 24 || 1 || 8.0 || .484 || – || .333 || 2.0 || .3 || .1 || .5 || 1.5
|-
| style="text-align:left;"| 2020–21
| style="text-align:left;"| Grand Canyon
| 24 || 24 || 28.7 || style="background:#cfecec;"| .707* || .000 || .718 || 9.7 || .7 || .4 || 1.3 || 14.2
|- class="sortbottom"
| style="text-align:center;" colspan="2"| Career
| 90 || 28 || 14.6 || .658 || .000 || .644 || 4.5 || .3 || .2 || .8 || 5.8

References

External links
Grand Canyon Antelopes bio
Wichita State Shockers bio

1997 births
Living people
Centers (basketball)
Crailsheim Merlins players
Danish expatriate basketball people in the United States
Danish men's basketball players
Grand Canyon Antelopes men's basketball players
Hørsholm 79ers players
People from Helsingør
Sportspeople from the Capital Region of Denmark
Wichita State Shockers men's basketball players
ZZ Leiden players